Sprucewoods is a community located at the North Gate of CFB Shilo and 20 km East of Brandon, MB on the #340 Highway. It is located in the Rural Municipality of Cornwallis.

Unincorporated communities in Westman Region